Pulau Sajahat (Malay for Sajahat Island), was a small island about 1.2 hectares located off the north-eastern coast of Singapore, near Pulau Tekong. The island, together with its smaller companion Pulau Sejahat Kechil, has been subsumed by Pulau Tekong with the land reclamation works on Pulau Tekong's southern and northwestern coasts.

See also
History of Singapore
Battle of Singapore

References
National Heritage Board (2002), Singapore's 100 Historic Places, Archipelago Press, 
Victor R Savage, Brenda S A Yeoh (2004), Toponymics - A Study of Singapore Street Names, Eastern University Press, 
National Heritage Board's plaque at Changi Beach Park.

External links 
 Satellite image of Pulau Sejahat and Pulau Sejahat Kechil - Google Maps
 Pulau Sejahat Image gallery

Sejahat
North-Eastern Islands